JYP may refer to: 

 J.Y. Park (born 1971), South Korean singer-songwriter and record producer
 JYP Entertainment, a K-pop record label, founded by J. Y. Park in 1997
 Park Jin-young (entertainer, born 1994), member of Got7
 JYP Jyväskylä, a Finnish ice hockey team in the SM-liiga founded in 1977
 JYP-Akatemia, an affiliated team in the Mestis league